See bird's-nest fern for other plants with this common name.

Asplenium nidus is an epiphytic species of fern in the family Aspleniaceae, native to tropical southeastern Asia, eastern Australia, Hawaii (ʻēkaha in Hawaiian), Polynesia, Christmas Island, India, and eastern Africa. It is known by the common names bird's-nest fern (a name shared by some other aspleniums) or simply nest fern.

Description
Spores develop in sori on the underside of the fronds. These sori form long rows extending out from the midrib on the back of the outer part of the lamina (frond). The fronds roll back as they brown and create a massive leaf nest in the branches and trunks of trees.

Taxonomy
Linnaeus was the first to describe bird's-nest fern with the binomial Asplenium nidus in his Species Plantarum of 1753.

A global phylogeny of Asplenium published in 2020 divided the genus into eleven clades, which were given informal names pending further taxonomic study. A. nidus belongs to the "Neottopteris clade", members of which generally have somewhat leathery leaf tissue. While the subclades of this group are poorly resolved, several of them share a characteristic "bird's-nest fern" morphology with entire leaves and fused veins near the margin. Both the 2020 study and a 2015 molecular study found that A. nidus is polyphyletic, meaning that some populations were not closely related to others—A. nidus from Madagascar, Vanuatu and New Guinea were more closely related to other species than each other. Hence a revision with sampling of the species across its range was required to delineate the taxon and identify cryptic species. A. nidus sensu lato forms a clade with the morphologically similar A. australasicum, but other bird's-nest ferns such as A. antiquum and A. phyllitidis form a separate subclade which is not particularly closely related.

Native distribution

Asplenium nidus is native to east tropical Africa (in Tanzania, inclusive of the Zanzibar Archipelago); temperate and tropical Asia (in Indonesia; East Timor; the island of Kyushu, and the Ryukyu Islands of Japan; Malaysia; the Philippines; Taiwan; and Thailand); and in Australasia (in the northern part of Queensland in Australia).

Habitat
Asplenium nidus can survive either as an epiphyte or terrestrial plant, but typically grows on organic matter. This fern often lives in palm trees, where it collects water and humus in its leaf-rosette. It thrives in warm, humid areas in partial to full shade. It dislikes direct sunlight and likes to be in full shade on the north facing garden wall.

Uses

However, many plants sold in America as A. nidus are actually Asplenium australasicum, which has longer sori, and a differently shaped midrib. Asplenium nidus has gained the Royal Horticultural Society's Award of Garden Merit.

Asplenium nidus has been used locally in folk medicine for asthma, sores, weakness, and halitosis.

The sprouts of A. nidus are eaten in Taiwan, known as 山蘇, pronounced shansu. (山 meaning "mountain", as in mountain vegetables). They may be stir-fried or boiled and are a traditional aboriginal vegetable, now popular enough to appear even on the menus of chain restaurants.

Protection
In Hong Kong, this species is under protection based on Forestry Regulations Cap. 96A.

References

Further reading
  LORENZI, H.; SOUZA, M.S. (2001) Plantas Ornamentais no Brasil: arbustivas, herbáceas e trepadeiras. Plantarum

External links
 
 
 Asplenium section - Flora Malesiana Symposium Abstracts

nidus
Ferns of Africa
Ferns of Asia
Ferns of Oceania
Ferns of Australia
Native ferns of Hawaii
Flora of Christmas Island
Flora of Malesia
Flora of Japan
Flora of the Ryukyu Islands
Flora of Taiwan
Flora of Tanzania
Flora of the Tubuai Islands
Flora of the Zanzibar Archipelago
Flora of Thailand
Flora of Queensland
Plants described in 1753
Epiphytes
Garden plants of Asia
Garden plants of Australia
House plants
Taxa named by Carl Linnaeus